Deogratias may refer to:

Saint Deogratias (d. 457), bishop of Carthage
Deogratias: A Tale of Rwanda (2000), graphic novel by Jean-Philippe Stassen